The Invisible Power is a 1921 American crime melodrama film directed by Frank Lloyd and released by Goldwyn Pictures.

Plot
As described in a film magazine, Sid Chambers (Peters), a thief, is released from prison and rejoins his pals at a Greek restaurant. He finds his former second story man Bob Drake (Ainsworth), without funds as he has developed a cough that discloses his whereabouts. The two crooks go to the country where Sid falls in love with a young woman, Laura Chadwick (Rich), who wants him to go straight. He becomes a travelling salesman and they live quietly in a small cottage until detective Mark Shadwell (Jennings) shows up. Shadwell has been pressured by his chief to make a showing in a big necklace robbery, so he arrests Sid and sends him back to prison. After Laura's child is born she is unable to provide for it and is compelled to give it up. The detective's wife (De Jainette) adopts the child. When Laura is arrested for vagrancy, the detective, thinking to make the husband confess to the necklace robbery, brings the couple together at his house. After they see the baby, the detective relents and frees Sid and his wife and helps return them to their home.

Cast
 House Peters as Sid Chambers
 Irene Rich as Laura Chadwick
 DeWitt Jennings as Mark Shadwell
 Sidney Ainsworth as Bob Drake
 Jessie De Jainette as Mrs. Shadwell
 William Friend as Mr. Miller
 Gertrude Claire as Mrs. Miller
 Lydia Yeamans Titus as The Giggling Neighbor

References

External links

1921 films
American silent feature films
American black-and-white films
Films directed by Frank Lloyd
1921 crime drama films
American crime drama films
Melodrama films
1921 drama films
1920s American films
Silent American drama films